Jason McLaughlin (born April 14, 1982 in Provo, Utah) is an American soccer player who last played for Portland Timbers U23s in the USL Premier Development League.

Career

College and amateur
McLaughlin grew up in Wetumpka, Alabama, and attended the University of Alabama at Birmingham, playing on the men's soccer team from 2000 to 2005, scoring 15 goals and assisted on 13 others during his career. McLaughlin captained the Blazers his junior season and led them to a third-place finish the Conference USA tournament. He led the team in scoring his senior season with five goals and eight assists and received numerous accolades for his performance, including a NSCAA All-South Region third-team selection and All-C-USA second-team honors.

During his college years McLaughlin also played one season with the Augusta Fireball of the USL Premier Development League.

Professional
McLaughlin signed his first professional contract in 2006 when he joined the Atlanta Silverbacks of the USL First Division. He played 28 games, scoring 5 goals, in his debut season. On January 11, 2007, the Silverbacks traded him and Fabian Dawkins to the Montreal Impact in exchange for Mauricio Salles and Dan Antoniuk.

On April 11, the Impact then traded McLaughlin to the Vancouver Whitecaps for Sita-Taty Matondo, with McLaughlin never having pulled on an Impact jersey.  McLaughlin spent the 2007 season in Vancouver, featuring in 19 games.

On November 14, 2007, the Silverbacks announced they had re-signed McLaughlin to a three-year contract after he was released by the Whitecaps.  In January 2009, following Atlanta's demise, he moved to the Portland Timbers of the USL-1. He played 21 games for Portland in 2009 before being released on December 7, 2009; he subsequently signed to play for the Timbers' USL Premier Development League affiliate, Portland Timbers U23s, as an over-age player and assistant coach. He made his debut for the U23s on May 21, 2010 in a game against the Spokane Spiders.

Honors

Portland Timbers
USL First Division Commissioner's Cup (1): 2009

References

External links
 Portland Timbers bio
 Atlanta Silverbacks bio
 A Conversation with Jason McLaughlin

1982 births
Living people
American expatriate sportspeople in Canada
American expatriate soccer players
American soccer players
Atlanta Silverbacks players
Augusta FireBall players
Expatriate soccer players in Canada
Association football forwards
Association football midfielders
Montreal Impact (1992–2011) players
People from Wetumpka, Alabama
Portland Timbers (2001–2010) players
Portland Timbers U23s players
Soccer players from Alabama
UAB Blazers men's soccer players
USL First Division players
USL League Two players
Vancouver Whitecaps (1986–2010) players
Faulkner Eagles men's soccer